Pre-media or premedia is a term used in the design, creative and publishing industries with an evolving and contestable meaning. For some persons in those industries, it refers to any number of activities that occur between the moment an initial idea for a product is articulated and the moment production is complete. This can include further product ideation and the finalization of a product concept including a strong clear message of positive product differentiation; prototype development and design, market testing,  prototype modification and finalization; and the management of all of these processes leading to and including the digital and/or print production that takes place after they are complete. For some working premedia groups, it can even include further production needed later in the life of the product when market need supports it.

Overview
Premedia should supply design execution from early concept visualization all the way to ready-to-publish files developed on industry-standard software, delivered on the platform of choice and ensuring that the client’s requirements are met. In short, premedia can include all activity from any form of input to any form of output.

It includes the processes that allow an individual or company to visually communicate its message to its audience in the medium that best suits the demographics for that message. This should all be provided in the correct specifications and for the desired output channel(s).

With such a vast landscape to cover, premedia has a number of categories that fall under its banner. Those categories, listed below, have a vast array of technical requirements each complementing and dependent upon each other to provide rich and relevant content to the destination channel.

History
The term "premedia" has been developed in tandem with the Internet and mobile communications industries, both of which have arguably evolved to almost dominate modern day life.

As these forms of communication and access to consumers have continued to grow, so the need to facilitate brand messages and publishing into this new space have become a necessity. As a result of this, the traditional method of communication through print has morphed into a multichannel environment in which marketing, communications, and publishing can access clients via many means.

Hence, traditional companies involved in the print-oriented activities of prepress, repro and creative have adapted in order to utilize the various output delivery channels required by clients. These companies are increasingly servicing all of these channels with existing and new client work; a whole new world of file creation, preparation, management and transition has been developed. The term "premedia" has arisen in an attempt to encompass the entirety of this new world of multichannel media delivery.

See also 
 Web-to-print
 Job Definition Format
 Printing press check
 Prepress

Graphic design
Printing